Tessa Edwards (born 16 August 1994) is a Canadian-born Guyanese footballer who plays as a midfielder. She has been a member of the Guyana women's national team.

Early life
Edwards was raised in Whitby, Ontario.

High school and college career
Edwards attended the All Saints Catholic Secondary School in her hometown. After graduating there, she joined the Purdue University Fort Wayne in Fort Wayne, Indiana, United States.

International career
Edwards represented Guyana at the 2012 CONCACAF Women's U-20 Championship qualifying. At senior level, she capped during the 2010 CONCACAF Women's World Cup Qualifying.

See also
List of Guyana women's international footballers

References

1994 births
Living people
Citizens of Guyana through descent
Guyanese women's footballers
Women's association football midfielders
Purdue Fort Wayne Mastodons women's soccer players
Guyana women's international footballers
Guyanese expatriate footballers
Guyanese expatriate sportspeople in the United States
Expatriate women's soccer players in the United States
Sportspeople from Whitby, Ontario
Soccer people from Ontario
Canadian women's soccer players
Canadian sportspeople of Guyanese descent
Canadian expatriate women's soccer players
Canadian expatriate sportspeople in the United States